Tomb TT192, located in the necropolis of El-Assasif in Thebes, Egypt, is the tomb of Kheruef, also called Senaa, who was Steward to the Great Royal Wife Tiye, during the reign of Amenhotep III. It is located in El-Assasif, part of the Theban Necropolis.

TT192 complex
The tomb of Kheruef is large enough to have several later tombs associated with it, or placed within its substructure. These tombs date from the 19th Dynasty all the way to the late period.
 Tombs TT189 (annex), TT190 (Esbanebdjed) and TT191 (Wahibre-nebpehti) have their entries on the east side of the north wall of the courtyard of Kheruef's tomb. The tombs date to the Late Period.
 Tombs TT189 (Nakhtdjehuty) and TT194 (Thutemhab) have entrances off the east side of the courtyard of TT193. A stela of TT193 is located in front of these structures.
 Tombs TT195 (Bakenamun), TT196 (Padihorresnet), TT406 (Piay) and TT364 (Amenemhab) have entries located on the south wall of the courtyard.
 Tomb TT407 (Bintenduanetjer) is located off the south side of the first columned hall of Kheruef's tomb.

Decoration

The reliefs in the tomb contain depictions of Tiye, Amenhotep III (shown as a weak and elderly figure in some decorations) and Akhenaten (named as Amenhotep). Hence, its decoration program started late in the final years of Amenhotep III and the earliest phase of Akhenaten's reign.

See also
 List of Theban tombs

References

Buildings and structures completed in the 15th century BC
Theban tombs
Buildings and structures of the Eighteenth Dynasty of Egypt